Anna Klüpfel (born 4 August 1903) was a Swiss fencer. She competed in the women's individual foil event at the 1948 Summer Olympics. She was born in London in the United Kingdom.

References

External links
 

Year of death missing
Swiss female foil fencers
Olympic fencers of Switzerland
Fencers at the 1948 Summer Olympics
1903 births